CCGS Westport is a Canadian Coast Guard search and rescue vessel homeported in Westport, Nova Scotia.

She is a Canadian Coast Guard Arun-class motor lifeboat, based on the United Kingdom   design.
She entered service in 1997.

Westport is staffed by a crew of four and allows rescued persons to survive one day before help arrives.

See also

Westport is one of ten Arun-class lifeboats operated by the Canadian Coast Guard:

  - one of two lifeboat operating out of Sambro, Nova Scotia.
  - same class of boat operating out of Clark's Harbour, Nova Scotia.

References

Arun-class lifeboats of the Canadian Coast Guard
1997 ships
Ships built in Ontario
Ships of the Canadian Coast Guard